This is a list of all Wycombe Wanderers F.C. players with 250 or more first-team appearances for the club, in descending order of number of appearances.

References

 

Players
 
Wycombe Wanderers
Association football player non-biographical articles